The South Sudan Liberal Party (Juba Arabic: حزب الليبرالي جنوب السودان Hizb Al-Liberali Janub Al-Sudan) is a political party in South Sudan. The party was formed on 1 October 2010. At their first General Assembly meeting on 17 December 2011, the members of SSLP decided that, in light of the limited political space and the strong desire of the youth to become involved in the res publica, the SLLP should transfer its activities to the South Sudan Liberal Youth Forum (Juba Arabic: شباب الليبرالي جنوب السودان Shabab Al-Liberali Janub Al-Sudan) (SSLYF) until 2015.

The party is a member of the  Africa Liberal Network and its youth wing is member of the Organization of African Liberal Youth-Liberals Energizing Africa's Democracy (OALY-LEAD).

Sources:
 SSLP Fact Sheet
 SSLP Web Site.

SSLP timeline
24 October 2017: leader of the SSLP, Peter Mayen Majongdit stated the country should "give enough time for peace to prevail before rushing to the elections" in an attempt postpone the upcoming general elections in 2018.

References

External links
Official website of the South Sudan Liberal Party
Official website of the South Sudan Liberal Youth Forum

Political parties in South Sudan
Liberal parties in Africa
Political parties established in 2010